Bruce Frederick Joseph Springsteen (born September 23, 1949) is an American singer, songwriter, and musician who is both a solo artist and the leader of the E Street Band. During a career that has spanned five decades, Springsteen has become known for his poetic and socially conscious lyrics and lengthy, energetic stage performances, earning the nickname "The Boss".

Springsteen has sold more than 135 million records worldwide and more than 64 million records in the United States, making him one of the world's best-selling music artists. He has earned numerous awards for his work, including 20 Grammy Awards, two Golden Globes, an Academy Award, and a Tony Award (for Springsteen on Broadway). Springsteen was inducted into both the Songwriters Hall of Fame and the Rock and Roll Hall of Fame in 1999, received the Kennedy Center Honors in 2009, was named MusiCares person of the year in 2013, and was awarded the Presidential Medal of Freedom by President Barack Obama in 2016.

Academy Awards 

|-
| 1994
| "Streets of Philadelphia"
| Academy Award for Best Original Song
| 
|-
| 1996
| "Dead Man Walkin'"
| Academy Award for Best Original Song
|

American Music Awards 

|-
| 1985
| Himself
| Favorite Pop/Rock Male Artist
| 
|-
| 1985
| "Dancing in the Dark"
| Favorite Pop/Rock Song
|
|-
| 1985
| Himself
| Favorite Pop/Rock Male Video Artist
|
|-
| 1986
| Himself
| Favorite Pop/Rock Male Artist
|
|-
| 1986
| Born in the U.S.A.
| Favorite Pop/Rock Album
|
|-
| 1986
| Himself
| Favorite Pop/Rock Male Video Artist
| 
|-
| 2016
| The River Tour 2016
| Tour of the Year
|

Audie Awards 

|-
| 2018
| Born to Run
| Best Autobiography/Memoir
|

Brit Awards 

|-
|1985
|Himself
|International Artist
|
|-
|1986
|Himself
|International Solo Artist
|
|-
|1987
|Himself
|International Solo Artist
|
|-
|2003
|Himself
|International Male Solo Artist
|
|-
|2006
|Himself
|International Male Solo Artist
|
|-
|2008
|Himself
|International Male Solo Artist
|
|-
|2010
|Himself
|International Male Solo Artist
|
|-
|2011
|Himself
|International Male Solo Artist
|
|-
|2013
|Himself
|International Male Solo Artist
|
|-
|2020
|Himself
|International Male Solo Artist
|

Emmy Awards 

|-
| 2001
| Bruce Springsteen & The E Street Band
| Outstanding Variety, Music or Comedy Special
| 
|-
| 2009
| Bruce Springsteen and the E Street Band Super Bowl Halftime Show
| Outstanding Special Class – Short-Format Live-Action Entertainment Program
| 
|-
| 2019
| Springsteen on Broadway
| Outstanding Variety Special (Pre-Recorded) 
|

Golden Globe Awards 

|-
| 1994
| "Streets of Philadelphia"
| Golden Globe Award for Best Original Song
| 
|-
| 2009
| "The Wrestler"
| Golden Globe Award for Best Original Song
|

Grammy Awards 
Springsteen has won 20 Grammy Awards out of 50 nominations.

Juno Awards 

|-
| 1985
| Born in the U.S.A.
| International Album of the Year
| 
|-
| 1993
| Himself
| International Entertainer of the Year
|

Grammy Hall of Fame 

|-
| 2003
| Born to Run
| Grammy Hall of Fame
| 
|-
| 2012
| Born in the U.S.A.
| Grammy Hall of Fame
| 
|-
| 2021
| Greetings from Asbury Park, N.J.
| Grammy Hall of Fame
|

MTV Video Music Awards 

|-
| 1985
| "I'm on Fire"
| Best Male Video
| 
|-
| 1985
| "Dancing in the Dark"
| Best Stage Performance
|
|-
| 1985
| "Dancing in the Dark"
| Best Overall Performance
|
|-
|1985
| "We Are the World"
|Viewer's Choice
|
|-
| 1986
| "Glory Days"
| Best Male Video
|
|-
| 1986
| "Glory Days"
| Best Overall Performance
|
|-
| 1987
| "Born to Run"
|Best Stage Performance
|
|-
| 1987
| "War"
|Best Stage Performance
|
|-
| 1988
| "Tunnel of Love"
| Video of the Year
|
|-
| 1988
| "Tunnel of Love"
| Best Male Video
|
|-
| 1988
| "Tunnel of Love"
| Viewer's Choice
|
|-
| 1992
| "Human Touch"
| Best Male Video
|
|-
| 1994
| "Streets of Philadelphia"
| Best Male Video
|
|-
| 1994
| "Streets of Philadelphia"
| Best Video from a Film
|
|-
| 1997
| "Secret Garden"
|Best Video from a Film
|

Tony Awards 

|-
| 2018
| Himself
| Special Tony Award
|

Other recognition 
 Polar Music Prize in 1997
 Inducted into the Rock and Roll Hall of Fame, 1999
 Inducted into the Songwriters Hall of Fame, 1999
 Inducted into the New Jersey Hall of Fame, 2007
 "Born to Run" named "The unofficial youth anthem of New Jersey" by the New Jersey state legislature; something Springsteen always found to be ironic, considering that the song "is about leaving New Jersey"
 The minor planet 23990, discovered September 4, 1999, by I. P. Griffin at Auckland, New Zealand, was named in his honor.
  Ranked No. 23 on Rolling Stone magazine's 2004 list of the 100 Greatest Artists of All Time
 Made Time magazine's 100 Most Influential People of the Year 2008 list
 Won Critics' Choice Movie Award for Best Song with "The Wrestler" in 2009
 2009 Kennedy Center Honors recipient
 Forbes magazine ranked him 6th in The Celebrity 100 in 2009
 Named 2013 MusiCares Person of the Year
 2016 Presidential Medal of Freedom recipient
 Springsteen was the guest on BBC Radio 4's Desert Island Discs on December 18, 2016, talking about his childhood, family, mental health and his musical influences and development
 Monmouth University has held academic symposia in 2005, 2009, 2012, 2018 and 2020 (scheduled), in which scholars present on Springsteen's work, and the university houses the Bruce Springsteen Archives and Center for American Music.
 In 2021, Springsteen won the Woody Guthrie Prize in recognition of being an artist who carries on the spirit of the folk singer.

References

Bruce Springsteen
Springsteen, Bruce